These are the official results of the Men's javelin throw event at the 1998 European Championships in Budapest, Hungary. There were a total number of 26 participating athletes. The final was held on 23 August 1998, two days after the qualification round where the mark was set at 82.00 metres. Title defender Steve Backley from Great Britain won the title for a third time in a row, setting a new championship record in the final round: 89.72 metres.

Medalists

Schedule
All times are Central European Time (UTC+1)

Abbreviations
All results shown are in metres

Records

Competitors
European list as of August 17, 1998, just before the start of the competition

Qualification

Group A

Group B

Final

See also
 1993 Men's World Championships Javelin Throw (Stuttgart)
 1995 Men's World Championships Javelin Throw (Gothenburg)
 1996 Men's Olympic Javelin Throw (Atlanta)
 1997 Men's World Championships Javelin Throw (Athens)
 1999 Men's World Championships Javelin Throw (Seville)
 2000 Men's Olympic Javelin Throw (Sydney)
 2001 Men's World Championships Javelin Throw (Edmonton)

References
 Results
 todor66
 koti.welho

Javelin throw
Javelin throw at the European Athletics Championships